The Bram Stoker Award for Lifetime Achievement annually recognizes one to three living artists for "superior achievement in an entire career" which has "substantially influenced the horror genre". It is conferred by the Horror Writers Association, and most winners have been horror fiction writers, but other creative occupations are eligible.

The Bram Stoker Awards, including the lifetime honor in particular, were established along with the Association itself in 1987. They are presented in the year following the award year, which is the publication year for most of the awards program.

The winners are selected by the annual Lifetime Achievement Award Committee, which comprises five HWA members appointed by the President. Unlike the literary awards, which are determined by vote of all members, there are no official runners-up.

Jo Fletcher, Nancy Holder, and Koji Suzuki are the most recent winners, all three receiving the award on May 12–15, 2022.

Recipients

The annual committee may bestow up to 
fu awards, by unanimous agreement, and it need not bestow any. In fact, though, there has been at least a single winner every year, and there were three winners for 1987, and more recently 2020 and 2021. There were 40 Lifetime Achievement Awards in the first 25 years, through the 2011/2012 cycle.

Multiple awards

Six of the Stoker Award winners have also been named SFWA Grand Masters by the Science Fiction and Fantasy Writers of America: Leiber, Simak, Bradbury, Ellison, Jack Williamson, and Moorcock.

See also

References

External links
 The Bram Stoker Awards Weekend 2013

Literary awards honoring lifetime achievement
Lifetime Achievement
Awards established in 1987
1987 establishments in the United States
English-language literary awards